The October 2015 Hindu Kush earthquake was a magnitude 7.5 earthquake that struck South Asia on 26 October 2015, at 13:39 AFT (14:09 PKT; 14:39 IST; 09:09 UTC) with the epicenter 45 km north of Kuran wa Munjan, Afghanistan, at a depth of 212.5 km.

By 5 November, it was estimated that at least 399 people were killed, mostly in Pakistan. Tremors were felt in Pakistan, Uzbekistan, Turkmenistan, Tajikistan and Kyrgyzstan. According to the United States Geological Survey (USGS), Pakistan is located in one of the most earthquake active zones in the world.  The earthquake was also felt in New Delhi, in both Pakistan's Azad Kashmir territory, and the Indian state of Jammu and Kashmir and as far as Lucknow and in the prefectures of Kashgar, Aksu, Hotan, and Kizilsu in Xinjiang, China while damage was also reported in Afghan capital Kabul. The earthquake was also felt in the Nepalese capital of Kathmandu.

Background

The Himalayan mountains, pushed up by the collision of tectonic plates, are prone to devastating quakes. An earthquake in April 2015, Nepal's worst in 80 years, killed over 8,600 people.

The last major earthquake in the same region of similar magnitude (7.6 Mw) was almost exactly ten years prior in October 2005, which resulted in 87,351 deaths, 75,266 injured, 2.8 million people being displaced, and 250,000 farm animals dying. The notable difference between this earthquake and the 2005 earthquake is the focal depth and its location with respect to the densely populated areas. The 2005 earthquake was 15 km deep and centered close to some densely populated areas while this earthquake was 212.5 km deep and centered farther from populated areas, reducing its damaging effects.

In recent studies, geologists claim that global warming is one of the reasons for increased seismic activity. According to these studies melting glaciers and rising sea levels disturb the balance of pressure on Earth's tectonic plates thus causing an increase in the frequency and intensity of earthquakes. This could be one of the reasons why the Himalayas are getting more prone to earthquakes in recent years.

Earthquake
The main earthquake occurred on 26 October 2015 at 13:39 AFT (14:09 PKT, 14:39 IST, 09:09 UTC) at a depth of approximately 212.5 km, with its epicenter approximately 82 km southeast of Feyzabad, Afghanistan. The USGS initially measured the quake's magnitude at 7.7, then revised it down to 7.6 and later to 7.5. The Pakistan Meteorological Department, however, said the magnitude of the earthquake was 8.1. According to USGS, the epicentre was 67 km from Chitral.

Casualties and damage 

In Afghanistan, 115 people were killed, including five in Jalalabad, and twelve schoolgirls aged 10 to 15 who perished in a crowd crush while trying to exit a school building in Takhar.

The earthquake and subsequent aftershock swarm resulted in 280 fatalities, injuries to 1,770 persons, and notable damage to 109,123 buildings. Widespread damage in Federally Administered Tribal Areas, Gilgit-Baltistan and Khyber Pakhtunkhwa provinces of Pakistan. The most affected areas from Khyber Pakhtunkhwa include Shangla, Lower Dir, Upper Dir, Swat and Chitral, which were in close proximity of the epicenter. As a result of land sliding, the Karakoram Highway was closed. The observed damage was mostly concentrated in rural and old urban masonry buildings, both being built with no or minimal consideration for earthquake loading and having been constructed employing poor construction practices.

In India, 4 people were killed in Jammu and Kashmir. A Delhi Metro spokesman told AFP "All of around 190 trains plying on the tracks were stopped at the time of the earthquake." Mobile phone services were choked for several hours because of the high voice traffic.

In Tajikistan, 14 children suffered injuries in Yovon district when stairs at a local school collapsed.

Rescue and relief
 Pakistani Prime Minister Nawaz Sharif directed all federal, civil, military and provincial agencies to declare an immediate alert and mobilise all resources to ensure the security of citizens of Pakistan. According to Inter-Services Public Relations, Chief of Army Staff General Raheel Sharif has directed army personnel to reach out where required to help affected people without waiting for orders.

 Chief executive officer of Afghanistan Abdullah Abdullah called an emergency meeting of senior officials to respond to the disaster.

 The Indian Prime Minister, Narendra Modi, contacted Afghan President Ashraf Ghani and Pakistani Prime Minister Nawaz Sharif and offered help.

 According to UN Secretary-General Ban Ki-moon, UN agencies are mobilizing to assist Pakistani and Afghan relief operations.

See also
 List of earthquakes in 2015
 List of earthquakes in Afghanistan
 List of earthquakes in Pakistan
 Thrust tectonics

References

External links

 Detailed report from the United States Geological Survey
 Technical report from the National Geophysical Research Institute
 Satellite imagery map of the region affected by the earthquake from NASA
 
 

2015 earthquakes
2015 in Afghanistan
2015 disasters in Pakistan
2015 disasters in India
Earthquakes in Afghanistan
Earthquakes in Pakistan
Earthquakes in Tajikistan
Earthquakes in India
October 2015 events in Asia
October 2015 events in Afghanistan 
October 2015 events in India
October 2015 events in Pakistan
October earthquake